Patry is a family name derived from French given name Patrice or equivalent. It may refer to:

People
André Patry (1902–1960), French astronomer
Bernard Patry (born 1943), Canadian politician
Claude Patry (born 1953), Canadian politician
Denis Patry (born 1953), Canadian ice hockey player
Guillaume Patry (born 1982), Canadian professional video-game player
Pierre Patry (1933–2014), Canadian film director and screenwriter
Rudy Patry (born 1961), Belgian racing cyclist
Walter Patry (1917–1945), highly decorated Luftwaffe (German air force) pilot during World War II
William F. Patry (born 1950), American copyright lawyer
Yvan Patry (1948–1999), Canadian documentary filmmaker
Maurice Patry (1948- ), Accountant London

Places
Bernières-le-Patry, commune in Lower Normandy, France
Culey-le-Patry, commune in Lower Normandy, France
Kłopoty-Patry, village in Podlaskie province, Poland
La Lande-Patry, commune in Lower Normandy, France
Le Mesnil-Patry, commune in Lower Normandy, France

Others
1601 Patry, minor planet named after André Patry